During 2011, tropical cyclones  formed within seven different tropical cyclone basins, located within various parts of the Atlantic, Pacific and Indian Oceans. During the year, a total of 131 tropical cyclones had formed this year to date. 71 tropical cyclones had been named by either a Regional Specialized Meteorological Center (RSMC) or a Tropical Cyclone Warning Center (TCWC). Thirty-nine of these named systems eventually intensified into hurricane-equivalent tropical cyclones. The most active basin in the year was the Western Pacific, which documented 21 named storms. North Atlantic basin documented 19 named storms, continuing the consecutive third-most active season trends from the previous year, due to the 2010–12 La Niña event. Conversely, the Eastern Pacific basin featured slightly more activity than the previous season, with 11 named storms. The least active basin in the year was the North Indian Ocean basin which documented only 2 named storms, the lowest since the 1993 season. Activity across the Southern Hemisphere were almost evenly spread, with the South-West Indian Ocean basin recording 10 tropical cyclones, the Australian region recording 17 tropical cyclones, and the South Pacific basin also recording 10 tropical cyclones, respectively. Twenty-one Category 3 tropical cyclones formed in the year, including three Category 5 tropical cyclones.

The strongest tropical cyclone of the year was Typhoon Songda, with a minimum central pressure of 920 hPa (mbar). The costliest tropical cyclone of the year was Hurricane Irene, which caused $14.2 billion worth of damage. The deadliest tropical cyclone of the year was Severe Tropical Storm Washi, which killed 2,546 people.

Global atmospheric and hydrological conditions

Summary

Systems

January

 
During January 2011, a total of 12 tropical cyclones, all of them, formed within the southern hemisphere. No tropical cyclone was observed in the northern hemisphere. Of the systems, 7 further intensified to become named. Out of the systems, Wilma was the most intense tropical cyclone, with a minimum barometric pressure of 935 mbar/hPa.

February

10 systems formed and 5 named storms during February.

March

March was a relatively inactive month in which 11 systems formed, and only 3 received names.

April

May

 
May was a mostly inactive month in which only 4 tropical cyclones formed, in which 2 received names.

June

July

August

August was the most active month of 2011, with 18 systems forming in the month.

September

September was a below-average month, with only 16 tropical cyclones forming in that month.

October

November

November was inactive with only 7 tropical cyclones forming, as well as Rolf, a system that formed in the Mediterranean sea.

December

Global effects

See also

 Tropical cyclones by year
 List of earthquakes in 2011
 Tornadoes of 2011

Notes
1The "strength" of a tropical cyclone is measured by the minimum barometric pressure, not wind speed. Most meteorological organizations rate the intensity of a storm by this figure, so the lower the minimum pressure of the storm, the more intense or "stronger" it is considered to be.
2 Only systems that formed either on or after January 1, 2011 are counted in the seasonal totals.
3 Only systems that formed either before or on December 31, 2011 are counted in the seasonal totals.4 The wind speeds for this tropical cyclone/basin are based on the IMD Scale which uses 3-minute sustained winds.
5 The wind speeds for this tropical cyclone/basin are based on the Saffir Simpson Scale which uses 1-minute sustained winds.
6The wind speeds for this tropical cyclone are based on Météo-France which uses wind gusts.

References

External links

Regional Specialized Meteorological Centers
 US National Hurricane Center – North Atlantic, Eastern Pacific
 Central Pacific Hurricane Center – Central Pacific
 Japan Meteorological Agency – NW Pacific
 India Meteorological Department – Bay of Bengal and the Arabian Sea
 Météo-France – La Reunion – South Indian Ocean from 30°E to 90°E
 Fiji Meteorological Service – South Pacific west of 160°E, north of 25° S

Tropical Cyclone Warning Centers
 Meteorology, Climatology, and Geophysical Agency of Indonesia – South Indian Ocean from 90°E to 141°E, generally north of 10°S
 Australian Bureau of Meteorology (TCWC's Perth, Darwin & Brisbane) – South Indian Ocean & South Pacific Ocean from 90°E to 160°E, generally south of 10°S
 Papua New Guinea National Weather Service – South Pacific Ocean from 141°E to 160°E, generally north of 10°S
 Meteorological Service of New Zealand Limited – South Pacific west of 160°E, south of 25°S

Tropical cyclones by year